Icky Thump is the sixth and final studio album by American rock duo The White Stripes, released through Warner Bros. and Third Man Records in June 2007, with XL Recordings handling the United Kingdom release. Its first release came on June 15, 2007, in Germany, with the release for the rest of Europe occurring on June 18 and the rest of the world on June 19.

Icky Thump received positive reviews from critics and enjoyed commercial success, entering the UK Albums Chart at number one and debuting at number two on the Billboard 200, becoming the duo's highest-charting album in the US with 223,000 copies sold. By late July, Icky Thump was certified gold in the United States. On February 10, 2008, the album won a Grammy Award for Best Alternative Music Album.

Recording and production 
After Get Behind Me Satan, Icky Thump marks a return to the punk, garage rock and blues influences for which the band is known. Additionally, the album introduces Scottish folk music, avant-garde, trumpet, and bagpipes into the formula, whilst simultaneously reintroducing older characteristics such as the first studio recording of the early White Stripes song "Little Cream Soda".

Icky Thump was recorded and mixed entirely in analog at Nashville's Blackbird Studio by Joe Chiccarelli. According to Chiccarelli in an interview with HitQuarters, the band had already rehearsed and demoed around half the album, with the rest being conceived in the studio. The album took almost three weeks to record—the longest of any White Stripes album. The recording differed from previous albums in that White had the comparative luxury of recording to 16-track analog rather than his usual 8-track. Also, Chiccarelli said: "We spent a little more time than he is used to experimenting and trying different things on that album, whether it was different ways to record the drums or the vocals, or different arrangements, or cutting takes together." Trumpet player Regulo Aldama, who appears on "Conquest", was discovered by Jack White at a local Mexican restaurant.

Jack White said that the album would appeal to fans of the band's self-titled debut, suggesting a stripped-down garage rock sound. A statement on the band's official website (spuriously attributed to "Kitayna Ireyna Tatanya Kerenska Alisof" of the Moscow Bugle, a reference to the 1966 Batman film) humorously claims that:

Entertainment Weeklys online site had an interview with Michel Gondry in which he said he would be directing a video for "I'm Slowly Turning Into You". He mentions the idea for the video. Gondry also says that the video idea came first, and after mentioning the idea to Jack White, White wrote the song to fit that idea.

On May 30, 2007, Chicago radio station Q101 aired the entire album without the band's permission. Jack called into the station and reacted angrily about them playing it.  In the liner notes of Icky Thump, "Electra" is thanked on the second line, just after God. According to Ben Blackwell, Jack White's nephew, this is not directed towards the radio DJ, Electra, but to a pet Jack and Meg White used to have.

The White Stripes announced the completion of Icky Thump on February 28, 2007. The title is derived from "ecky thump", a Lancashire colloquial response of surprise, popularized by an episode of the 1970s UK comedy series The Goodies. On Later with Jools Holland (broadcast June 1, 2007) Jack attributed the album's name to its use as an exclamation by his wife, who is from Oldham, historically in Lancashire. He added that the deliberate misspelling was to make it easier for an American audience to identify with. The liner notes for Icky Thump also suggest the spelling variation was due to concerns over copyright infringement.

The Pearly Kings and Queens costume theme, which the band used for this album, is a traditional Cockney outfit, somewhat contrary to the Northern dialect of the title.

 Theme 
Jack White told Blender in July 2007 that Icky Thump "is about feeling positive about being alive, taking deep breaths and just being really happy."

 Promotion and release 

The album artwork features Jack and Meg dressed as Pearlies.

To promote Icky Thump before its release, the band distributed custom-designed boxes and previewed tracks from the record through Ice Cream Man. The ice cream promotion focused on the Coachella, Sasquatch, and Bonnaroo festivals and culminated in the band's release show on June 20, 2007, at the site of the former West Hollywood Tower Records on Sunset Blvd., temporarily rechristened Icky Thump. Records."Ice Cream Man – The White Stripes at Icky Thump Records" icecreamman.com 

In addition to being released on CD and 180 gram vinyl, the band released the album on a limited edition 512 MB USB drive  which was designed by British artist Stanley Chow  There are two versions, one of which depicts Jack, the other depicting Meg. The manufacturing was limited to 3,333 of each, and were shipped the week of the U.S. release. Each drive contained the album in Apple lossless format.

The 180 g vinyl edition contains alternate versions of both "Icky Thump" and "Rag and Bone". "Icky Thump" is a shorter, radio edit mix with. It contains a short section where the main guitar riff is mixed to sound like it's being played through an AM radio. This mix also edits the penultimate chorus to be 14 seconds shorter before the guitar solo. "Rag and Bone" is also a different mix and contains different Jack White vocals for each verse (possibly the original guide vocals and there are no vocals from Meg) and is missing the harmonies from the last chorus.

The vinyl version was mastered by Steve Hoffman.

A special mono mix of Icky Thump was available on 180 gram vinyl for a short time to Third Man Vault Premium Account subscribers.

 Reception 

The album received critical acclaim, with an overall average rating of 80 out of 100 at Metacritic. Barry Nicolson with British magazine NME wrote, "Icky Thump is brilliant, there's no way around that." Commenting on the album's "fuller sound and relaxed flights of fancy," Heather Phares of AllMusic said "Icky Thump is a mature, but far from stodgy" album, and that "it's just great fun to hear the band play." Jody Rosen, writing for Blender, called the album "the sound of a band not stretching out so much as digging in: burrowing deeper into loamy soil they know well." In one of the more negative reviews, Josh Tyrangiel of Time remarked, "The White Stripes are too weird and talented to be boring, but it sounds like they might be a little bored." Ultimately giving the album 3.5 out of 5 stars and giving an (A-) on his website, Robert Christgau, with Rolling Stone, summed up the return album this way "Although the new constructions don't entice as consistently as they should, their noise stays with you. And what that noise stands for is itself." He added, "Like his sometime heroes Led Zeppelin, Jack White builds monuments. They're suitable for awestruck visits. But they're no place to settle down."

On December 6, 2007, Icky Thump was nominated for four 2007 Grammy Awards: Best Alternative Album, Best Boxed or Special Limited Edition Package, Best Rock Song, and Best Rock Performance by a Duo or Group with Vocal for the single "Icky Thump", winning Best Alternative Album and Best Rock Performance by a Duo or Group With Vocal. Q Magazine named Icky Thump as the 2nd best album of 2007. Furthermore, the album placed #17 on Rolling Stones list of the Top 50 Albums of 2007.

 Track listing 

 Personnel The White StripesJack White – vocals, guitar, mandolin, keyboards, synthesizers, 1st spoken narrative on "Rag and Bone", street talk on "I'm Slowly Turning Into You", production, mixing
Meg White – drums, percussion, backing vocals, lead vocals on "St. Andrew", 2nd spoken narrative on "Rag and Bone", street talk on "I'm Slowly Turning Into You"Additional personnelRegulo Aldama – trumpet on "Conquest"
Jim Drury – Scottish smallpipes on "Prickly Thorn, but Sweetly Worn" and "St. Andrew"
Steve Hoffman – vinyl mastering
Vlado Meller – digital mastering
Joe Chiccarelli - recording and mixing engineer
Lowell Reynolds - recording and mixing second engineer

 Charts 

Weekly charts

Year-end charts

Certifications and sales

 Notes 

 References 
Dolon, John (July 2007), "The White Stripes: New Jack City" Blender Volume unknown:' pp. 109–112

External links 

Icky Thump – The Leak, stream of the whole album from MTV.com

The White Stripes albums
2007 albums
Warner Records albums
XL Recordings albums
Grammy Award for Best Alternative Music Album
Albums produced by Jack White
Third Man Records albums